The Island of the Fay is the 120th release and twenty-ninth main studio album by the electronic group Tangerine Dream. It was first revealed in late February 2011, and was released on March 18. A preview of "Fay bewitching the Moon" was released to the members who were part of the Tangerine Dream Online Club (TDOC). This is the first release to feature violinist Hoshiko Yamane as a band member. This album marks the beginning of the band's new "Sonic Poems" series.

Track listing

Personnel
Tangerine Dream
Edgar Froese 
Thorsten Quaeschning
Linda Spa
Iris Camaa
Bernhard Beibl
Hoshiko Yamane

References

2011 albums
Tangerine Dream albums
Music based on works by Edgar Allan Poe